The year 2003 is the first year in the history of Jungle Fight, a mixed martial arts promotion based in Brazil. In 2003 Jungle Fight held 1 event, Jungle Fight 1.

Events list

Jungle Fight 1

Jungle Fight 1 was an event held on September 13, 2003 at Ariau Amazon Towers Convention Center, Elephant & Castle in Manaus, Amazonas, Brazil.

Results

References

2003 in mixed martial arts
Jungle Fight events